Between 57.3 and 59.5 latitude and 21.5 and 28.1 longitude, Estonia lies on the eastern coast of the Baltic Sea on the level northwestern part of the rising East European Platform. Estonia's continental mainland is bordered to the north by the Gulf of Finland (part of the Baltic Sea) across from Finland, to the east by Lake Peipus and Russia, and to the south by Latvia. Besides the part of the European continent, Estonian territory also includes the larger islands of Saaremaa and Hiiumaa, and over 2,200 other islands and islets in the Baltic Sea, off the western and northern shores of the country's mainland.

Average elevation in Estonia reaches .
 
The climate is maritime, wet, with moderate winters and cool summers. Oil shale and limestone deposits, along with forests which cover 47% of the land, play key economic roles in this generally resource-poor country. Estonia boasts over 1,500 lakes, numerous bogs, and 3,794 kilometers of coastline marked by numerous bays, straits, and inlets.

Geographic features

Estonia is a flat country covering , of which internal waters comprise 4.6%. Estonia has a long, shallow coastline along the Baltic Sea, with 1,520 islands dotting the shore. The two islands are favorite Estonian vacation spots. There are more than 1,400 natural and artificial lakes in Estonia. The largest of them, Lake Peipus, forms much of the border between Estonia and Russia. Located in central Estonia, Võrtsjärv is the second-largest lake. The Narva and Emajõgi are among the most important of the country's many rivers.

A small, recent cluster of meteorite craters, the largest of which is called Kaali are found on the Estonian island of Saaremaa. The impact may have been witnessed by the Iron Age inhabitants of the area.

Estonia has a temperate climate, with four seasons of near-equal length.

Estonia's land border with Latvia runs ; the Russian border runs . From 1920 to 1945, Estonia's border with Russia, set by the 1920 Tartu Peace Treaty, extended beyond the Narva river in the northeast and beyond the town of Petseri in the southeast.

Fauna

There live 65 different species of mammals in the Estonian forests. There are an estimated 700 brown bears, over 150 wolves, 400 lynxes, 14,000–16,000 beavers, 3,400 wild boars, 10,000–11,000 moose and 120,000–130,000 deer. There are also red deer and other wild animals.

Flora

Environmental issues

One of the most burdensome legacies of the 1944–1991 Soviet occupation of Estonia is widespread environmental pollution. The worst offender in this regard was the Soviet army. In the 1990s, during the army's withdrawal from Estonia, extensive damage was done to discarded buildings and equipment. In October 1993, the Estonian Ministry of Environment issued a preliminary report summing up part of the degradation it had surveyed thus far. The report described the worst damage as having been done to Estonia's topsoil and underground water supply by the systematic dumping of jet fuel at six Soviet army air bases. At the air base near Tapa, site of the worst damage, officials estimated that  of land were covered by a layer of fuel;  of underground water were said to be contaminated. The water in the surrounding area was undrinkable, and was sometimes set fire by locals to provide heat during the winter. With Danish help, Estonian crews began cleaning up the site, although they estimated the likely cost to be as much as 4 million EEK. The Ministry of Environment assigned a monetary cost of more than 10 billion EEK to the damage to the country's topsoil and water supply. However, the ministry was able to allocate only 5 million EEK in 1993 for cleanup operations.

In a 1992 government report to the United Nations Conference on the Environment and Development, Estonia detailed other major environmental concerns. For instance, for several consecutive years Estonia had led the world in the production of sulfur dioxide per capita. Nearly 75% of Estonia's air pollution was reported to come from two oil shale-based thermal power stations operating near Narva. The mining of oil shale in northeastern Estonia has also left large mounds of limestone tailings dotting the region. Near the town of Sillamäe, site of a former uranium enrichment plant, about 1,200 tons of uranium and about 750 tons of thorium had been dumped into a reservoir on the shore of the Gulf of Finland. This was said to have caused severe health problems among area residents. In the coastal town of Paldiski, the removal of waste left by Soviet army nuclear reactors was also a major concern. The combined cost of environmental cleanup at both towns was put at more than EEK3.5 billion.

Natural hazards: flooding occurs frequently in the spring in certain areas

Environment – current issues: air polluted with sulfur dioxide from oil-shale burning power plants in northeast; however, the amounts of pollutants emitted to the air have fallen dramatically and the pollution load of wastewater at purification plants has decreased substantially due to improved technology and environmental monitoring; Estonia has more than 1,400 natural and manmade lakes, the smaller of which in agricultural areas need to be monitored; coastal seawater is polluted in certain locations.

Environment – international agreements:
party to: Air Pollution, Air Pollution-Heavy Metals, Air Pollution-Nitrogen Oxides, Air Pollution-Persistent Organic Pollutants, Air Pollution-Sulphur 85, Air Pollution-Volatile Organic Compounds, Antarctic Treaty, Biodiversity, Climate Change, Climate Change-Kyoto Protocol, Climate Change-Paris Agreement, Comprehensive Nuclear Test Ban, Desertification, Endangered Species, Environmental Modification, Hazardous Wastes, Law of the Sea, Marine Dumping-London Protocol, Ozone Layer Protection, Ship Pollution, Tropical Timber 2006, Wetlands, Whaling

Area and boundaries

Area:
total: 
land: 
water: 
note: includes 1,520 islands in the Baltic Sea

Land boundaries:
total: 
border countries: Latvia , Russia 

Coastline: 

Maritime claims:
territorial sea: 

exclusive economic zone: limits as agreed to by Estonia, Finland, Latvia, Sweden, and Russia

Elevation extremes:
lowest point: Baltic Sea 0 m
highest point: Suur Munamägi

Geographical (landscape) areas
Northern Estonia (roughly equivalent to Põhja-Eesti maastikuvaldkond (:et), which includes the capital city Tallinn)
Southern Estonia
Western Estonia
Eastern Estonia

Resources and land use

Natural resources: oil shale (kukersite), peat, rare earth elements, phosphorite, clay, limestone, sand, dolomite, arable land, sea mud

Land use (2018 est.):

 agricultural land: 22.2% (14% arable land, 0.1% permanent crops, 7.2% permanent pasture)
 forest: 52.1%
 other: 25.7%

Irrigated land: 

Total renewable water resources:  (2017 est.)

See also 

 Extreme points of Estonia
 Climate of Estonia

References